Ana Barros may refer to:
Ana Barros (cyclist) (born 1973), Portuguese cyclist
Ana Barros (handballer) (born 1993), Angolan handball player
Ana Barros (swimmer) (born 1969), Portuguese swimmer
Ana P. Barros, American civil and environmental engineer 
Ana Beatriz Barros (born 1982), Brazilian model
Ana Lúcia Barros (born 1965), Brazilian volleyball player